Maja Mihalinec Zidar (born 17 December 1989) is a Slovenian sprinter. She competed at the 2015 World Championships in Athletics, 2016 World Indoor Championships, 2016 Olympics and 2019 World Championships in Athletics.

Personal life
Mihalinec's mother Damijana is a volleyball coach and former player, and her younger sister Katja played volleyball internationally. Maja also started with volleyball, but her physical education teacher persuaded her to take up athletics. For some time she trained in both sports, but then chose running. Her partner Luka Zidar is a competitive high jumper.

Mihalinec studied social sciences at the University of Ljubljana and communications at the University of Nebraska Omaha. In 2015, she was named Female Athlete of the Year by the Athletic Federation of Slovenia.

Competition record

Personal bests
Outdoor
100 metres – 11.27 (+1.1 m/s, Padova 2019)
200 metres – 22.78 (+0.7 m/s, Doha 2019)
Indoor
60 metres – 7.21 (Glasgow 2019)
200 metres – 23.47 (Vienna 2015)

References

External links

 

1989 births
Living people
Slovenian female sprinters
World Athletics Championships athletes for Slovenia
Athletes (track and field) at the 2016 Summer Olympics
Olympic athletes of Slovenia
People from the Municipality of Mozirje
Athletes (track and field) at the 2019 European Games
European Games medalists in athletics
European Games gold medalists for Slovenia
Athletes (track and field) at the 2020 Summer Olympics
Olympic female sprinters
20th-century Slovenian women
21st-century Slovenian women